Veles is a municipality in central part of North Macedonia. Veles is also the name of the city where the municipal seat is found. Veles Municipality is part of the Vardar Statistical Region.

Geography
The municipality borders Čaška Municipality and Zelenikovo Municipality to the west, Petrovec Municipality to the north, and Gradsko, Lozovo, and Sveti Nikole municipalities to the east. There are 28 populated locations, one town and 27 villages.

Demographics
According to the last national census from 2021, this municipality had 48,463 inhabitants. At the census of 1994, it had 56,571 inhabitants.

References

External links

 Official website

 
Vardar Statistical Region
Municipalities of North Macedonia